Albert Phelan (born 27 April 1945 in Sheffield, England, died 18 April 2016) was an English footballer.

Phelan joined Chesterfield from local non-league side Charlton United in 1964. He joined Halifax Town in 1974.

After retiring from playing he spent five years at Boston United, the last two as manager. He went on to serve Sheffield Wednesday in a number of scouting and coaching roles.

Notes

1945 births
Sportspeople from Sheffield
Footballers from Sheffield
2016 deaths
English footballers
Association football defenders
Chesterfield F.C. players
Halifax Town A.F.C. players